Chambord is a 16.5% abv raspberry liqueur modelled after a liqueur produced in the Loire Valley of France during the late 17th century. The Chambord product brand has been owned and produced by the Brown-Forman Corporation since 2006.

Chambord is made from red and black raspberries, Madagascar vanilla, Moroccan citrus peel, honey and cognac.

History
The Chambord brand was developed in 1982 by Norton "Sky" Cooper at his family's cordial company, Charles Jacquin et Cie (later his son, Scott Cooper, would develop the elderflower  liqueur, St-Germain). The drink was inspired by raspberry liqueur made in the Loire Valley in the late 1600s, said to have been introduced to Louis XIV during one of his visits to the château de Chambord. It was common during that time for liqueurs and cognac to be consumed with elegant meals.

In 2006, the Chambord product brand was acquired by the Brown-Forman Corporation.

Production
Chambord is produced in the Loire Valley  from raspberries and blackberries, Madagascar vanilla, Moroccan citrus peel, honey and cognac. Whole raspberries and blackberries are steeped in French spirits for a period of several weeks to produce a fruit infusion.

After the infusion is extracted, a second set of spirits is added to the fruit and allowed to rest for a few weeks. After this second infusion is drawn off, the remaining fruit is pressed to obtain the natural sugars and juice. The fruit-infused spirits and juices from the final pressing are then combined, and finally, the berry infusion is combined with a proprietary blend of cognac, natural vanilla extract, black raspberries, citrus peel, honey, and herbs and spices. The liqueur is 16.5% alcohol by volume.

Bottle
Chambord comes in a spherical bottle. Until mid-2010, the bottle came with a metallic gold plastic lettered 'belt' around the middle, and a crown atop its lid. The bottle was modelled after a globus cruciger.

In the U.S. market, the manufacturer began using a different bottle design in summer 2010, with modifications to the belt, lid and other elements.

In addition to redesigning the bottle for the traditional Chambord liqueur, the manufacturer has also begun using the Chambord brand name on a flavoured vodka.

Cocktails
Common drinks made from Chambord include the raspberry margarita, French manhattan, Kir Impérial (Chambord and champagne), Chambord Daiquiri, Chambord royal spritzer, and the French martini. The French martini started the "cocktails as a martini" craze.

Awards
Since 2007, Chambord has earned silver and bronze medals from the San Francisco World Spirits Competition.  Other spirit ratings organizations have rated Chambord relatively highly as well.  Based on Chambord's reviews from various professional raters, Proof66 has categorized Chambord as a "First Tier" liqueur.

References

External links
Official website

Berry liqueurs
Brown–Forman brands
French liqueurs
Honey liqueurs and spirits
Products introduced in 1982
Raspberry